Madhuri  is a 1989 Indian Kannada-language film, directed by  K. V. Jayaram and produced by Smt Meenakshi Jayaram. The film stars Geetha, Vinod Alva, Lokanath and Datthathreya in the lead roles. The film has musical score by Sangeetha Raja.

Cast

 Geetha
 Vinod Alva
 Lokanath
 Datthathreya
 Keerthi
 Sathyajith
 Mysore Lokesh
 Dingri Nagaraj
 Jr. Narasimharaju
 Honnavalli Krishna
 Pranayamurthy
 B. Ramayya
 K. Vijaya
 Suma
 Pramila Joshai
 Vijaya Somanna
 Prabhavathi
 Chethan Ramarao
 Master Adarsh
 Dhanu Suvarna
 Lokesh

References

1989 films
1980s Kannada-language films
Films based on Indian novels